Koghbavan is a town in the Armavir Province of Armenia. The town is located in southwestern Armavir Province, in an area once closed to foreigners.

See also 
Armavir Province

References 

Populated places in Armavir Province